Ingrid van Kessel, born  in Turnhout is a Belgian Flemish politician, representing CD&V.

She has a degree in Germanic philology (KUL) and was an educational collaborator.

Career 
1995-1999 : Member of the Chamber of Representatives 
1999-2004 : Member of the Flemish Council
1999-2003 : Community Senator appointed by the Flemish Council

Honours 
Knight of the ordre de Léopold (2003)

References 

Members of the Senate (Belgium)
Members of the Flemish Parliament
Christian Democratic and Flemish politicians
KU Leuven alumni
1959 births
People from Turnhout
Living people